Mark Wakeling (born 11 October 1971) is a British actor and founder of The Actors Temple in London.

Biography

After serving as an officer in the Coldstream Guards Wakeling trained as an actor at The Poor School in London, graduating in 1998. He founded The Actors' Temple in 2003 and has since trained under Tom Radcliffe. As well as being a working actor, Wakeling founded The Actors' Temple with Ellie Zeegen and teaches Meisner there. He has worked with Ken Loach on The Wind That Shakes The Barley and played the part of Captain Tom Ryan in Series 1 of ITV’s Primeval which premiered in 2007. However, Mark's character died at the end of the first series, so didn't return when the second series aired in 2008.

The Actors' Temple

Mark Wakeling is the co-founder and co-director of The Actors' Temple studio which offers a full training for professional actors enabling them to practice their craft on a daily basis.

Filmography

References

Mark Wakeling Fellowship (unofficial yahoo group) https://groups.yahoo.com/group/markwakelingfellowship

External links 
 
 The Actors' Temple. Visited July 21, 2011.

Living people
1971 births